Oedipoda is the type genus of grasshoppers, in the subfamily Oedipodinae, mostly from the Palaearctic realm.  The type species is the European "blue-winged grasshopper", Oedipoda caerulescens.

Species
The Orthoptera Species File lists:
species group caerulescens (Linnaeus, 1758)
 Oedipoda caerulescens (Linnaeus, 1758)
 Oedipoda canariensis Krauss, 1892
 Oedipoda charpentieri Fieber, 1853
 Oedipoda miniata (Pallas, 1771)
 Oedipoda schochii Brunner von Wattenwyl, 1884
species group germanica (Latreille, 1804)
 Oedipoda aurea Uvarov, 1923
 Oedipoda coerulea Saussure, 1884
 Oedipoda fuscocincta Lucas, 1847
 Oedipoda germanica (Latreille, 1804)
 Oedipoda venusta Fieber, 1853
species group not determined
 Oedipoda cynthiae Fontana, Buzzetti & Massa, 2019
 Oedipoda discessa Steinmann, 1965
 Oedipoda fedtschenki Saussure, 1884 (2 subspecies)
 Oedipoda himalayana Uvarov, 1925
 Oedipoda infumata Bey-Bienko, 1949
 Oedipoda jaxartensis Uvarov, 1912
 Oedipoda kurda Descamps, 1967
 Oedipoda ledereri Saussure, 1888
 Oedipoda liturata Le Guillou, 1841- southwestern Pacific
 Oedipoda maculata Le Guillou, 1841 - Sulawesi
 Oedipoda muchei Harz, 1978
 Oedipoda neelumensis Mahmood & Yousuf, 1999
 Oedipoda pernix Steinmann, 1965
 Oedipoda tincta Walker, 1870
 Oedipoda turkestanica Steinmann, 1965
† extinct species
 †Oedipoda germari Heer, 1865
 †Oedipoda haidingeri Heer, 1865
 †Oedipoda longipennis Poncrácz, 1928
 †Oedipoda nigrofasciolata Heer, 1849
 †Oedipoda oeningensis Heer, 1849
 †Oedipoda pulchra Poncrácz, 1928

References

External links

Acrididae genera
Oedipodinae
Taxa named by Pierre André Latreille
Orthoptera of Europe